Holder's Green is a hamlet near the village of Lindsell, in the Uttlesford district of Essex, England.

The hamlet is the site of the Essex Wildlife Trust Nature Reserve of 'Sweetings Meadow' which can be found on the hamlet's western approach from Richmonds Green.

Holder's Green contains two listed buildings including Wayhours and Wrens.

Other nearby settlements include the towns of Great Dunmow and Thaxted and the hamlets of Richmond's Green and Bustard Green.

References 

Hamlets in Essex
Uttlesford